Solar power in the United Arab Emirates has the potential to provide most of the country's electricity demand. While being a major oil producing country, the United Arab Emirates (UAE) has taken steps to introduce solar power on a large scale. However, solar power still accounts for a small share of energy production in the country. 
The country was the 6th top carbon dioxide emitter per capita in the world in 2009, with 40.31 tonnes, but is planning to generate half of its electrical energy by 2050 from solar and nuclear sources, targeting 44% renewables, 38% gas, 12% coal, and 6% nuclear energy sources.

By region

Abu Dhabi

In 2013, the Shams solar power station, a 100-megawatt (MW) concentrated solar power (CSP) plant near Abu Dhabi became operational. The US$600 million Shams 1 is the largest CSP plant outside the United States and Spain and is expected to be followed by two more stations, Shams 2 and Shams 3.

Masdar City in Abu Dhabi was designed to be the most environmentally sustainable city in the world. Power is generated by a 10 MW solar PV power plant located on site and 1 MW of rooftop solar panels. Originally planned to have all rooftop panels, it was found easier to clean the sand off ground mounted panels at a single location.It Is located on Abu Dhabi.

In 2020 the 2 GW Al Dhafra Solar project was announced by the Abu Dhabi Electricity and Water Authority. A consortium led by France's EDF and China's Jinko Solar will build the  PV plant in the Al Dhafra region, about 35km south of Abu Dhabi City, using bifacial (dual-sided) crystalline technology. It will offer the lowest solar energy tariff in the world - AED4.97 fils/kWh (US1.35 cents/kWh).  It is due to be commissioned in 2022.

Dubai
The Dubai Clean Energy Strategy aims to provide 7 per cent of Dubai's energy from clean energy sources by 2020. It will increase this target to 25 per cent by 2030 and 75 per cent by 2050.  Due to a variety of factors, a Saudi-backed consortium had a low bid to build the solar farm in Dubai for only 3¢/kWh.

The first phase of the proposed 1,000 MW Mohammed bin Rashid Al Maktoum Solar Park, in Saih Al-Dahal, about 50 kilometers south of the city of Dubai, was the 13-megawatt (DC) solar farm (DEWA 13) that had been constructed by First Solar in 2013. It uses 152,880 FS-385 black CdTe modules and generates about 24 gigawatt-hours per year.

The second phase is a 200 MWAC (260 MWp) photovoltaic plant built at a cost of US$320 million by a consortium led by ACWA Power and Spanish company TSK. The second phase was scheduled to be commissioned by April 2017. It was completed ahead of time, and commissioned on 22 March 2017. TSK served as the primary contractor for the project, while ACWA Power will operate the plant. The phase includes 2.3 million photovoltaic solar panels spread over an area of 4.5 km2. ACWA Power secured a 27-year debt financing loan worth $344 million from the First Gulf Bank, the National Commercial Bank and the Samba Financial Group. The plant uses First Solar's CdTe modules.

In April 2015, Dubai Electricity and Water Authority (DEWA) publicly announced the third phase of 800 MW, along with Dubai's revised target to increase the share of renewables on the energy mix to 7% by 2020.

The Mohammed bin Rashid Al Maktoum Solar Park is one of the world's largest renewable projects based on an independent power producer (IPP) model. Besides the three phases that consist of solar farms using PV technology, the long-term project will also include concentrating solar power (CSP). The total capacity of the entire project is planned to reach 3,000 MW.

The 200-megawatt second phase of the project caused worldwide attention, as the winning bid of the tender set a new record-low tariff of only US ¢5.89 per kilowatt-hour. This is about 20% lower than any previous, unsubsidized power purchase agreement (PPA) the world has seen before. The PPA is set to a 25-year time frame.

In parallel to the utility-scale projects of the Mohammed bin Rashid Al Maktoum Solar Park, in March 2015 DEWA also launched a net metering scheme to encourage companies and private individuals to install solar power on their roofs. While the scheme is currently voluntary, solar panels are to be made mandatory for all buildings in Dubai by 2030.

Ras Al Khaimah
In 2016, UTICO, a private Emirati desalination and power company, proposed building two photovoltaic system plants in Ras Al Khaimah: a 120 MW farm and a 20 MW farm. American University of Ras Al Khaimah conducts research on solar power and runs a solar/diesel hybrid mini-grids.

Ras Al Khaimah has revealed a strategy in January 2019 of building a 1.2GW solar project consisting of 600MW of rooftop solar and 600MW of utility-scale projects called Barjeel as part of the emirate's strategy in achieving 30% energy efficiency improvements, 20% water savings and 20% renewable energy generation by 2040.

See also 

Energy in the United Arab Emirates
Dubai Electricity and Water Authority
Sharjah Electricity and Water Authority
List of power stations in the United Arab Emirates

External links 
  – Michael Liebreich, "Cheapest Solar in World", about the record-low 5.84 US cents/kWh PPA in Dubai
 Solar Energy in Dubai, Mohammed bin Rashid Al Maktoum Solar Park, DEWA, Government of Dubai

References